Disneymania 2 is the second installment in the Disneymania album series presenting songs from Disney films, performed by various musical artists. Much like its predecessor, Disneymania, Disneymania 2 was commercially successful, certified Gold in November, 2005. Disneymania 2 was more successful in that it peaked at number 29 on the Billboard 200. Singles released from Disneymania 2 were "Circle of Life" by the Disney Channel Circle of Stars, and "Anytime You Need a Friend" by the Beu Sisters. Also, No Secrets made a video of "Once Upon (Another) Dream" that aired on the Disneymania 2 commercials, and was featured on the special edition DVD release of Sleeping Beauty.

Critical reception 
Allmusic gave the album a rating of 3 out of 5 stars, writing "While many Disney classics were already given this treatment on the first Disneymania, this trip back to the well isn't entirely dry; for every uninspired cover like Jump5's "Welcome," there are fun reinterpretations like the Baha Men's "It's a Small World" and the Beu Sisters' "He's a Tramp." Not surprisingly, the oldest, best-known Disney songs hold up the best after their teen pop makeovers: even though it's saddled with an overwrought techno arrangement". The site concluded "While it's an uneven album and not as strong as its predecessor, Disneymania, Vol. 2 still has enough entertaining moments to make it worth a listen."

Track listing

^ Bonus Australian Track

Charts

Music videos
"True To Your Heart" - Raven-Symoné
"Circle of Life" - Disney Channel Circle of Stars
"Anytime You Need a Friend" - The Beu Sisters
"Once Upon (Another) Dream" - No Secrets
"I Wan'na Be Like You" - Nikki Webster
"Zip-A-Dee-Doo-Dah" - Stevie Brock
"The Siamese Cat Song" - Hilary & Haylie Duff

Singles
"Circle of Life" Disney Channel Circle of Stars - released to promote The Lion King Platinum Edition
"Anytime You Need a Friend" The Beu Sisters - released to promote Home on the Range soundtrack
"Once Upon (Another) Dream" No Secrets - released to promote Sleeping Beauty Special edition
"I Wan'na Be Like You" - Nikki Webster - released to promote The Jungle Book 2 DVD

Disneymania in Concert
 "True To Your Heart" -Raven-Symoné
 Welcome from Raven
 "The Second Star To The Right" - Jesse McCartney
 Backstage Interview with Jesse McCartney
 "Beautiful Soul" - Jesse McCartney
 "Anytime You Need A Friend" Music Video - The Beu Sisters
 "He's A Tramp" - The Beu Sisters
 Backstage Interviews with The Beu Sisters
 "Anytime You Need A Friend" - The Beu Sisters (From Home on the Range)
 Ashanti and Lil Sis Shi Shi's Colors of the Wind music video
 "Best Day of My Life" - Jesse McCartney
 "Shine" - Raven-Symoné (from "That's So Raven")
 Studio Interview with Stevie Brock
 "Zip-A-Dee-Doo-Dah" - Stevie Brock
 Circle of Life - Disney Channel Circle of Stars music video
 "All for Love" - Stevie Brock
 Backstage Interview with Stevie Brock
 "Supernatural" - Raven-Symoné

Note that Ashanti and Lil' Sis Shi Shi and Disney Channel Circle of Stars never take the stage.

References

Disneymania albums
Walt Disney Records compilation albums
2004 compilation albums